Costa Cordalis (born Konstantinos Cordalis; 1 May 19442 July 2019) was a Greek-German Schlager singer.

Biography 
Born Konstantinos Cordalis in Elateia, Phthiotis, Cordalis moved to Germany in 1960. His 1976 song "Anita" reached the top ten in Germany, Switzerland and Austria. In 2004, he took part in, and won, the reality television game show Ich bin ein Star – Holt mich hier raus!. In the same year, he admitted that he had a facelift in the Bodenseeklinik because he wanted to look younger. Cordalis competed for Greece in the FIS Nordic World Ski Championships 1985.

He had a son, Lucas, and two daughters, Kiki and Eva.

Awards 
 1981: Goldene Stimmgabel
 1986: Goldene Stimmgabel

References

External links 
 
 Official site

1944 births
2019 deaths
Sportspeople from Central Greece
People from Phthiotis
Greek emigrants to Germany
Naturalized citizens of Germany
Greek male cross-country skiers
German pop singers
Schlager musicians
20th-century German male singers
21st-century German male singers
20th-century Greek male singers
21st-century Greek male singers
Ich bin ein Star – Holt mich hier raus! winners
German expatriates in Spain
Greek expatriates in Spain